These are The Official UK Charts Company UK Official Indie Chart number one hits of 1997.

See also
1997 in music

References

United Kingdom Indie Singles
Indie 1997
UK Indie Chart number-one singles